Identity, Tradition, Sovereignty (ITS, stylized its) was a far-right political group in the European Parliament which was composed of 23 MEPs from European parties during the 6th term.  A common political charter for the group was signed on 9 January 2007, and the group was formally recognized by Parliamentary president Josep Borrell at the start of the EP plenary session on 15 January. Following remarks made by ITS member Alessandra Mussolini that Romanian ITS members found insulting, the Greater Romania Party (PRM) withdrew from the group, thus disqualifying it as an official group. Hence, it formally ceased to exist on 14 November 2007.

History
To form a political group in the European Parliament, there needed to be 20 MEPs from six different states (subsequently increased to 25 MEPs from seven states, for the 2009 session). The accession of Bulgaria and Romania brought into the European Parliament a number of new far-right MEPs providing sufficient numbers to form a far right group. Incentives for forming a group are approximately €1 million in public funds and guaranteed seats on the committees of the European Parliament. There were concerns in other parties about public funds and influence going towards a group with such an ideology. Despite attempts to block the group's formation, it was formed on 15 January 2007. However other MEPs successfully blocked ITS from gaining positions on Parliamentary committees, including two vice-presidencies, despite normally being entitled to them.

The largest component was France's National Front and its chairman in the Parliament, Bruno Gollnisch, was chair of the ITS group. The National Front had previous allied with other far right groups in the 1980s. Following the Bulgarian European Parliament elections, the group gained two more Ataka MEPs, Slavcho Binev and Desislav Chukolov.

The PRM announced on 8 November 2007 that it would withdraw its five members from the group on 12 November 2007 over comments made by Alessandra Mussolini over the expulsion of Romanian criminals from Italy in early November 2007, thus dooming the parliamentary group to falter less than a year after its creation. Andreas Mölzer stated in an interview with Die Presse that the group was searching for other MEPs who might join their group to save it. Other MEPs had already welcomed the prospect of the group's demise with Alyn Smith MEP stating that it "warms the heart" to watch them arguing amongst themselves. During the previous months, the group had failed to act as a coherent political faction.

It was announced that the group had been dissolved on 14 November 2007 after four of the five PRM members left the group.

Policies
The group's founding charter has been described as "broadly anti-immigration, anti-EU constitution and anti-Turkish EU membership," while participants emphasised that the group would function relatively loosely.  Alessandra Mussolini described it as "more a technical than a political group [...] We are mainly getting together out of necessity. Survival is only possible in a political group."

The Romanian PRM leader stated that he favoured a strong association and eventual EU membership for Turkey provided it settles the dispute regarding Cyprus and that the common ground for the new group is based exactly on the values the group's name suggests.

Members 

The membership of ITS while it existed between January and November 2007:

See also 
 Euronat
 Identity and Democracy
 Europe of Nations and Freedom (2015–2019)
 European National Front (2004–2009)
 Group of the European Right (1984–89)
 Technical Group of the European Right (1989–94)
 Pan-European identity

References

Further reading

External links 
 New political group: Identity, Tradition, Sovereignty in Opening of the January plenary session - Welcome of Bulgarian and Romanian MEPs / Formation of a new political group, European Parliament News (2007-01-15)
 Kontakt. Programm für Kunst und Zivilgesellschaft: Extended European right-wing extremism: new patriots, new alliances, (2007-03-27)
 Who's who in EU's new far-right group, BBC News (2007-01-12)
 Matthew Tempest: British MEP joins far-right group, The Guardian (2007-01-11)
 Ian Traynor: Romania's first gift to the European Union - a caucus of neo-fascists and Holocaust deniers, The Guardian (2007-01-08)

Organizations established in 2007
Organizations disestablished in 2007
Far-right politics
Former European Parliament party groups
Far-right political parties